F650 Pickups is a vehicle modifier and automotive distributor of mainly custom made Ford F-650 super trucks and XUVs. As well as custom made class 5 and 6 Navistar International, Freightliner, Chevrolet, and GMC Super trucks, 6 door Ford F-450 SUVs, and various used automobiles and trailers. All their products are distributed on theirs and 3rd party dealerships and also online. In 2006 the company's trucks were featured on automotive magazines like Rides magazine, Poker Runs America, Xtreme Boats, Dupont Registry, Exotic Car Buyers Guide.

Automotive models
Freightliner M2 Supertruck (4 Door)
Ford F-450 3XL 
Ford F-650 Supertruck (4 and 6 Door) 
Ford F-650 XUV - F650 Supertruck with Ford Excursion body
International 4400 Supertruck (4 Door)
International 7400 Supertruck (4 and 6 Door)
International CV Supertruck (4 Door)

Gallery

See also
Ford F-650

References

External links
Official Website
Ford F-150 Trucks

Automotive companies of the United States
Medium trucks
Ford F-Series